Ailbhe Nic Giolla Bhrighde is an Irish screenwriter and author.

From County Donegal, Nic Giolla Bhrighde resides in County Galway. She completed a degree in Celtic Studies and an MA in Modern Irish at National University of Ireland, Galway. She was a scriptwriter on Seacht (TV series) with the likes of Anne Learmont, Sean de Gallaí and Edel Ní Dhrisceoi. Her books include Cáca don Rí and Cócó an Colgán Cairdiúil.

External links
 
 https://www.imdb.com/name/nm1574227/

20th-century Irish people
21st-century Irish people
Living people
Irish-language writers
People from County Donegal
People from County Galway
Alumni of the University of Galway
Year of birth missing (living people)